Beyoncé: Platinum Edition is the first box set by American singer Beyoncé, released on November 24, 2014 at 12:00 AM, by Parkwood Entertainment and Columbia Records. A reissue of her fifth studio album Beyoncé (2013), it was released in recognition of its one-year anniversary and is packaged with the audio and visual discs from the original record. The project additionally includes another CD including two newly recorded songs and four previously-released remixes, and a second DVD containing ten live performances filmed during The Mrs. Carter Show World Tour (2013–14).

Beyoncé's fourth EP More Only was digitally released alongside the box set, offering the newly released material as an individual collection. The EP debuted at number 8 on the Billboard 200, selling 43,000 copies in its first week, but also garnered an additional 28,000 in album equivalent units. The release was promoted with the release of "Flawless (Remix)" in the United States as the lead single from the box set on August 12, 2014, followed by "7/11" on November 25, 2014.

Background and release
Beyoncé unexpectedly released her self-titled fifth studio album on December 13, 2013, without prior announcement at exactly 12:00 AM. The record was a commercial success, debuting at number one on the U.S. Billboard 200 with three-day sales of 617,000 copies, and remained at the summit of the chart for three in a half consecutive weeks. Additionally, the release has sold five million copies as of November 2014. Reports of a follow-up record first surfaced in November 2014, at which time it was widely speculated that Beyoncé would release a second volume of the project on November 25 without prior promotion. After that it was confirmed that a reportedly-leaked track listing for the record was "completely made up". Parkwood Entertainment instead announced that Beyoncé would be reissued in an expanded four-disc box set subtitled the Platinum Edition.

The Platinum Edition was released through physical retailers and online music stores on November 24, 2014; it was simultaneously made available on Spotify for the first time since the original record was premiered. The box set is packaged with the audio and visual discs from the original record, a DVD subtitled Live with ten performances filmed during The Mrs. Carter Show World Tour (2013–14), a six-track CD subtitled More, and a smaller version of the official 2015 Beyoncé calendar. Live and More were digitally released as a standalone extended play, titled More Only, through the iTunes Store and Amazon.com; the audio material was made available as individual downloads on Google Play.

New material
Of the six tracks included on More Only, four are remixes of the previously released songs, and two are newly recorded songs. "7/11", which is an uptempo hip hop piece, features Auto-Tune in its composition. The track incorporates several rapping verses by Beyoncé. Caitlin White from MTV News likened the song's production to that of Beyoncé's "Bow Down / I Been On", which was released in March 2013. Lyrically, "7/11" is about Beyoncé's detailing her dance moves: "I put up my hands up, spinning while my hands up / [...] Legs move it side to side, smack in the air." "Ring Off" is described as a midtempo reggae ballad that features dancehall rhythms with slight elements of dubstep. The track, in which she sings: "Mama, I understand your many sleepless nights / When you think about father / and how you tried to be the perfect wife... I wish you didn't hurt at all," addresses the end of a marriage between Beyoncé's parents, Tina and Mathew Knowles. "Standing on the Sun" is an uptempo reggae-inflected song with an island/Caribbean flavor to it. It originally was meant for the album along with Grown Woman, however it was removed from the track list around October 2013.

The extended play version of "Drunk in Love" features a guest appearance from Kanye West, who provided vocals for the official remix; the song features an explicit verse by himself and a slightly modified instrumental produced by Mike Dean. In his lines, West rapped about his wife Kim Kardashian and referenced the video for his own song, "Bound 2" (2013). Musically, the remix to "Flawless" was noted for being a slower version of the original and containing new, sexually explicit verses. It also contains a sample from the horns of Outkast's song "Spottieottiedopaliscious". 
Nicki Minaj provides a rapid-fire delivery using a low timbre. Her lyrics reference the work of Kanye West on the song "Monster", her own success and compares her detractors with Michael Jackson's convicted doctor through numerous punch lines.

Reception
Ben Sisario from The New York Times commented that the Platinum Edition continued the trend of "repackaging hit albums with some extra content" in order to maintain a successful commercial performance. Furthermore, he noted that Iggy Azalea reissued her debut studio album The New Classic (2014) as Reclassified and that Paramore re-released their self-titled fourth studio album (2013) in a deluxe version the same day that Beyoncé launched her repackage. However, Trans World Entertainment vice president for music merchandising Ish Cuebas acknowledged that initial interest in the Platinum Edition appeared "light".

In a review for Cuepoint, Robert Christgau gave the Platinum Edition an "A" grade and argued that, unlike most superfluous live DVDs, the third disc "rules, not just for Ms. Knowles's legendary stage discipline and expert dance routines but for a star-time visage further beautified by how readily it projects empathy, humor, and fun to fans who get it all". He concluded that this platinum edition of the album is the "best Bey ever" because the addition of the "More only" CD dilutes the tedious themes of dignity present on the original album in favor of more lustful, erotic songs. Christgau ranked its More Only portion as the seventh best album of 2014 in his year-end list for The Barnes & Noble Review.

Track listing
Credits adapted from the liner notes of Beyoncé: Platinum Edition.

Notes
  signifies a co-producer
  signifies an additional producer
  signifies a re-mixer
 All tracks feature vocal production by Beyoncé Knowles
 "No Angel" is stylized as "Angel"
 "Flawless" is stylized as "***Flawless"

Sampling credits
 "Partition" contains an interpolation of the French-dubbed version of the 1998 film The Big Lebowski, performed by Hajiba Fahmy.
 "***Flawless" contains portions of the speech "We should all be feminists", delivered by Chimamanda Ngozi Adichie.
 "Heaven" contains portions of "The Lord's Prayer" in Spanish, recited by Melissa Vargas.
 "Flawless Remix" contains a sample of "SpottieOttieDopaliscious" by OutKast.
 "Drunk in Love Remix" contains a sample of Kanye West's "Flashing Lights", vocals provided by Connie Mitchell.
 "Ring Off" contains portions of a speech delivered by Tina Knowles at the 2014 Texas Women's Empowerment Foundation Leadership Luncheon.

Charts

Album charts

Weekly charts

Year-end charts

Certifications

Release history

References

2014 compilation albums
Albums produced by Hit-Boy
Albums produced by Jerome "J-Roc" Harmon
Albums produced by Justin Timberlake
Albums produced by Key Wane
Albums produced by Noah "40" Shebib
Albums produced by Detail (record producer)
Albums produced by Pharrell Williams
Albums produced by Ryan Tedder
Albums produced by Timbaland
Beyoncé albums
Columbia Records compilation albums
Reissue albums
Albums produced by Beyoncé